Turn 10 Studios is an American video game developer based in Redmond, Washington. The company was established in 2001 under Microsoft Game Studios (now known as Xbox Game Studios) to develop the Forza Motorsport series for Xbox platforms. The most recent game developed solely by Turn 10 is Forza Motorsport 7, released in 2017.

History 
Turn 10 Studios was established in 2001 by Microsoft, under its Microsoft Game Studios division, to develop a series of racing games, which later became known as Forza. At the time of the studio's establishment, most staff had experience in publishing games, such as Project Gotham Racing and Golf 4.0, but had not been involved in game development. In October 2014, the studio employed approximately 100 full-time staff, as well as between 100 and 200 contract workers.

Technology 
Turn 10 develops and uses a proprietary game engine called ForzaTech, and proprietary editor called Fuel that allows multiple artists to work on the same level, primarily those for cars and racing tracks, simultaneously.

Games developed

References

External links 
 

2001 establishments in Washington (state)
American companies established in 2001
Companies based in Redmond, Washington
First-party video game developers
Forza
Microsoft subsidiaries
Video game companies established in 2001
Video game companies of the United States
Video game development companies
Xbox Game Studios